Dignity Health (formerly Catholic Healthcare West) was a California-based not-for-profit public-benefit corporation that operates hospitals and ancillary care facilities in three states. Dignity Health was the fifth-largest hospital system in the nation and the largest not-for-profit hospital provider in California. 

In February 2019, Dignity Health merged with Catholic Health Initiatives, becoming CommonSpirit Health.

Its headquarters are located in the China Basin Landing building in San Francisco.

History
Catholic Healthcare West was founded in 1986, when the Sisters of Mercy Burlingame Regional Community and the Sisters of Mercy Auburn Regional Community merged their health care ministries into one organization.

In 2010, Dignity Health, Blue Shield of California, and Hill Physicians Medical Group formed an Accountable Care Organization that covers 41,000 individuals in the California Public Employees Retirement System (CalPERS).

From the time of its founding until 2012, the company was an official ministry of the Catholic Church. In 2012, the company's corporate governance structure changed, moving it out of the Catholic Church's purview and resulting in a name change to Dignity Health.

Adeptus Health partnered with Dignity Health to establish the Dignity Health Arizona General Hospital in Laveen, Arizona.

In 2018, Dignity Health and CHI received approval from the Catholic Church, through the Vatican, to merge. The merger was completed, on February 1, 2019, under a new name, CommonSpirit Health, forming the second-largest nonprofit hospital chain in the United States.<ref>[https://www.chicagobusiness.com/health-care/steep-challenge-facing-chicagos-newest-health-care-giant "The steep challenge facing Chicago's newest health care giant" by Stephanie Goldberg; Chicago Business; May 3, 2019; accessed December 29, 2019.]</ref>

Dignity Health was the official health care provider of the San Francisco Giants.

Governance
The Board of Directors was responsible for approving major decisions affecting Dignity Health’s health care business, such as long-range strategic plans, the allocation of capital, joint ventures, and major acquisitions and sales. Dignity Health's Board of Directors are:

Dr. Andrew C. Agwunobi | Berkeley Research Group, LLC
Judy Carle, RSM (vice chairperson) | Sisters of Mercy of the Americas West Midwest Community
Caretha Coleman (chairperson) | Principal, Coleman Consulting
Lloyd H. Dean | President & CEO, Dignity Health
Mark DeMichele | Urban Realty Partners
Tessie Guillermo (secretary'') | President & CEO, Zero Divide
Peter Hanelt | Business Consultant
Dr. Rodney F. Hochman | Group President, Providence Health & Services
Julie Hyer, OP | Adrian Dominican Sisters

Sponsorship council
Although Dignity Health was not a Catholic institution, the organization owned and operated 24 Catholic hospitals. While overall fiscal responsibility for these hospitals rests with the Board of Directors, certain reserve rights are still held by the religious orders that founded them. The Sponsorship Council comprised sisters from each of the six Catholic religious communities that first opened each of the Catholic hospitals owned by Dignity Health. Each community selected one woman to act as one of the six members of the Sponsorship Council. The six Catholic religious communities were represented by:

Sheila Browne, RSM, Sisters of Mercy of the Americas, West Midwest Community, Burbank, CA
Lillian Anne Healy, CCVI, Sisters of Charity of the Incarnate Word, Houston, TX
Maureen McInerney, OP, Dominican Sisters of San Rafael, CA
Patricia Rayburn, OSF, Sisters of St. Francis of Penance and Christian Charity, Redwood City, CA
Corinne Sanders, OP, Adrian Dominican Sisters, Adrian, MI
Susan Snyder, OP, Congregation of Sisters of St. Dominic of St. Catherine of Siena, Taos, NM

Controversies

On December 21, 2010, Bishop Thomas Olmsted of the Roman Catholic Diocese of Phoenix declared that a Catholic Healthcare West hospital, St. Joseph’s Hospital and Medical Center, could no longer call itself a Catholic institution after a procedure was performed in 2009 to end a pregnancy to save a woman’s life. In a public statement, Bishop Olmsted said the procedure was in contrast to a direct abortion, which is in direct violation of The Ethical and Religious Directives for Catholic Health Care Services. In a statement, St. Joseph’s President Linda Hunt said the hospital would comply with Olmsted’s decision, but she defended the actions of the hospital staff, stating, "If we are presented with a situation in which a pregnancy threatens a woman’s life, our first priority is to save both patients. If that is not possible, we will always save the life we can save, and that is what we did in this case. Morally, ethically, and legally, we simply cannot stand by and let someone die whose life we might be able to save." The story made national headlines. Sister Carol Keehan, president of the Catholic Health Association of the United States, defended St. Joseph’s decision to terminate the pregnancy. "They had been confronted with a heartbreaking situation," she said in a formal statement. "They carefully evaluated the patient’s situation and correctly applied the Ethical and Religious Directives for Catholic Health Care Services to it, saving the only life that was possible to save."

In 2012, trustees of Ashland Community Hospital in Ashland, Oregon, invited Dignity Health to acquire it for debt. Community members raised concerns about the possible takeover, pointing to restrictions in Dignity's Statement of Common Values that might mean that the hospital would no longer offer abortion services, or euthanasia services under  Oregon's 1997 Death With Dignity Act. Asked by Ashland mayor John Stromberg if the Statement of Common Values could be modified, Dignity Vice-President for Ethics and Justice Education Carol Bayley told community members, "As far as loosening it, don't hold out hope. We have our feet in Catholic mud, there is no denying it." Facing increasing community opposition, Dignity Health ceased negotiations without explanation on October 30, 2012.

Dignity Health was included by California Attorney General Kamala Harris on the antitrust investigation, launched in September 2012, into whether growing consolidation in the state's hospitals and physician groups was driving up the health care costs.

As of summer 2018, Dignity Health did not provide many services considered routine by non-religious providers, including some emergency procedures. Dignity Health has cited the "Ethical and Religious Directives for Catholic Health Care Services" as its guideline in approving or refusing medical procedures. That document is prepared by the United States Conference of Catholic Bishops, which is not a medical organization. A particular controversy results from Dignity Health's non-Catholic marketing style, and unclear representations of which facilities are and are not considered Catholic.

Hospitals
Dignity Health owned or operated 40 hospitals—24 Catholic and 15 non-Catholic:

References

External links

 
 Catholic Healthcare West official website
 Consolidated Financial Statements: 2011 and 2010
 Dignity Health's Statement of Common Values

 
1986 establishments in California
Catholic health care
Christian organizations based in the United States
Companies based in San Francisco
Hospitals established in 1986
Healthcare in California
Healthcare in Arizona
Healthcare in Nevada
Hospital networks in the United States
Privately held companies based in California
Health care companies based in California
Health care companies established in 1986
Catholic hospital networks in the United States